Rikiosatoa is a genus of moths in the family Geometridae described by Inoue in 1982.

Species
Rikiosatoa bhutanica Inoue, 1992
Rikiosatoa euphiles (Prout, 1916)
Rikiosatoa fucataria (Wileman, 1911)
Rikiosatoa fucatariodes Sato, 1992
Rikiosatoa grisea (Butler, 1878)
Rikiosatoa hoenensis (Wehrli, 1943)
Rikiosatoa mavi (Prout, 1915)
Rikiosatoa transversa Inoue, 1998
Rikiosatoa vandervoordeni (Prout, 1923)

References

Boarmiini